Gwyddfarch was a hermit and founder of a Celtic abbey at Meifod in Wales.
He was a son of Amalarius and disciple of St. Llywelyn at Welshpool. About 550 AD he founded a monastery at Meifod. This establishment became the mother church of several other monasteries and was a centre of the order for over one thousand years, and within a generation the monastery had become a centre of pilgrimage.
 
Gwyddfarch taught Tysilio, who replaced him as abbot.

Legend holds that near the end of his life Tysilio talked the aging abbot out of a pilgrimage to Rome.
He is commemorated on 3 November.

References

Southwestern Brythonic saints
English Roman Catholic saints
6th-century Christian saints
6th-century Christians
Year of birth unknown
6th-century English monarchs